Kimbrell is the surname of the following people:
Anna Kimbrell (born 1990), American baseball player
Bettye Kimbrell (born 1936), American master folk artist for quilting 
Fuller Kimbrell (1909–2013), American politician
Gideon Kimbrell, American entrepreneur and software engineer 
James Kimbrell (born 1967), American poet
Marketa Kimbrell (1928–2011), Czechoslovak-American actress and acting teacher
Shawna Rochelle Kimbrell (born 1976), United States Air Force pilot

See also
Craig Kimbrel, Major League Baseball pitcher